Pseudodiacantha is an Asian genus of stick insects in the family Lonchodidae and subfamily Necrosciinae. Members of Pseudodiacantha are excellent examples of camouflage, as they are known to cover themselves in mossy or lichenous outgrowths that supplement their disguise.

Species
The Phasmida Species File lists:

 Pseudodiacantha chieni Seow-Choen, 2019
 Pseudodiacantha macklottii (de Haan, 1842)

References

External links
Phasmatodea.com: Anchiale modesta Redtenbacher, 1908

Lonchodidae
Phasmatodea genera
Phasmatodea of Asia
Insects described in 1908
Taxa named by Ludwig Redtenbacher